Ernest Vessiot (8 March 1865 – 17 October 1952) was a French mathematician. He was born in Marseille, France, and died in La Bauche, Savoie, France. He entered the École Normale Supérieure in 1884.

He was Maître de Conférences at Lille University of Science and Technology in 1892-1893, then moved at Toulouse and Lyon.

After 1910, he was a professor of analytical mechanics and celestial mechanics at the University of Paris. He presided over entrance examinations at the École Polytechnique. As director of École Normale Supérieure  until 1935, 
he overviewed the construction of its new physics, chemistry and geology buildings of 24, Rue Lhomond.

He was elected a member of the Académie des Sciences in 1943.

Vessiot's work on Picard–Vessiot theory dealt with the integrability of ordinary differential equations.

Works
 Leçons De Géométrie Supérieure (Hermann, 1919)

References

External links

 
 

French mathematicians
École Normale Supérieure alumni
Academic staff of the Lille University of Science and Technology
Members of the French Academy of Sciences
1865 births
1952 deaths